Ancylis mira is a species of tortricid moth in the family Tortricidae.

The MONA or Hodges number for Ancylis mira is 3368.

References

Further reading

 

Enarmoniini
Moths described in 1929